Pericles Cavalcanti (22 August 1926 – 28 October 2020) was a Brazilian equestrian who competed in the 1952 Summer Olympics.

References

External links
 

1926 births
2020 deaths
Brazilian male equestrians
Olympic equestrians of Brazil
Equestrians at the 1952 Summer Olympics